Santa Oliva is a village in the province of Tarragona and autonomous community of Catalonia, Spain. The municipality includes an exclave to the north-west,

References

External links
 Government data pages 

Municipalities in Baix Penedès